Cotton Belt is a region of the southern United States known for its historical cotton production.

Cotton Belt may also refer to:
 Cotton Belt, Arkansas, an incorporated community
 St. Louis Southwestern Railway, commonly known as the Cotton Belt Railroad
 Cotton Belt Rail Line, working name for the Silver Line, a commuter rail line under development in the Dallas–Fort Worth metroplex